The Handball Federation of Montenegro (RSCG) (Montenegrin: Rukometni savez Crne Gore) is the governing body of team handball in Montenegro. It is based in Podgorica.

It organizes the handball leagues:
 Montenegrin First League of Men's Handball
 Montenegrin Second League of Men's Handball
 Montenegrin First League of Women's Handball
 Montenegrin Second League of Women's Handball

It also organizes the Montenegrin national handball team and the Montenegrin women's national handball team as well as the Montenegrin national under-21 handball team and Montenegrin women's national under-21 handball team.

History
The Handball Federation of Montenegro was founded on 26 January 1958, while under the Yugoslav Handball Federation. Upon Montenegro's independence from Serbia and Montenegro, the Handball Federation of Montenegro represented the country. It joined the European Handball Federation and the International Handball Federation on 7 August 2006.

Presidents
 Mirčeta Pešić (1961-1964)
 Slobodan Filipović (1964-1974) 
 Osman Šabanadžović (1974-1982)
 Milan Paović (1982-1983)
 Slobodan Koljević(1983-1984) 
 Rade Đuričković(1984-1985) 
 Ratko Nikolić (1985-1990)
 Jusuf Bibezić (1990-1994)
 Radovan Nikolić (1994-1998) 
 Radomir Đurđić (1998–Present)

External links 
  

Federation, Handball
Handball
Montenegro
Sports organizations established in 1958